Chashkina is a rural locality (a village) in Solikamsky District, Perm Krai, Russia. The population was 23 as of 2010. There are 5 streets.

Geography 
Chashkina is located 17 km north of Solikamsk (the district's administrative centre) by road.

References 

Rural localities in Solikamsky District